The Freedom 21 is an American trailerable sailboat that was designed by Gary Hoyt and first built in 1982. It was available as a catboat or sloop rig.

Production
The design was built by Tillotson Pearson for Freedom Yachts in the United States from 1982 to 1987, but it is now out of production.

A retractable twin wing keel, iron ballast version was also built in the United Kingdom and at least 40 were sold.

Design
The Freedom 21 is a recreational keelboat, built predominantly of fiberglass, with wood trim. It has a catboat rig with a freestanding carbon fiber mast and a fully-battened mainsail. A sloop rig was optional. The hull has a raked stem, a vertical transom, a transom-hung rudder controlled by a tiller and a fixed fin keel or shoal draft keel.

The boat is normally fitted with a small  outboard motor for docking and maneuvering.

The design has sleeping accommodation for four people, with a double "V"-berth in the bow cabin and two straight settee berths in the main cabin. The galley is located on the starboard side just aft of the bow cabin. The galley is equipped with a sink.

For sailing the design is equipped with gun-mount spinnaker with a launching tube.

Variants
Freedom 21
This catboat model displaces  and carries  of ballast.
Freedom 21 SLP
This sloop-rigged model displaces  and carries  of ballast.
Freedom 21 SLP SD

Operational history
In a 2010 review Steve Henkel wrote, "here's a catboat with a modern flavor ... The deep fin is a better performer, but hard to get off a trailer without a crane. Best features: Deep cockpit coamings and a cockpit well proportioned for good foot-bracing help make the Freedom 21 a pleasure to sail. So does the easy-to-control gunmount spinnaker arrangement, which allows you to douse the chute by just popping the halyard and lowering the chute into its launching tube by hauling on a retrieving line. Worst features: Going forward isn't always easy, since the port side is taken over by the chute launching tube. She's not fast upwind, especially as a catboat. (A staysail can be rigged.) And her unusual appearance, with dark, wraparound 'windshield,' may not appeal to everyone."

See also
List of sailing boat types

References

External links
Photo of a Freedom 21

Keelboats
1980s sailboat type designs
Sailing yachts
Trailer sailers
Sailboat type designs by Gary Hoyt
Sailboat types built by Pearson Yachts